Paranaches simplex is a species of beetle in the family Cerambycidae, and the only species in the genus Paranaches. P. simplex was described by Pic in 1928.

It is found in Nepal.

References

Pteropliini
Beetles described in 1928
Insects of Nepal
Taxa named by Maurice Pic
Taxa named by Stephan von Breuning (entomologist)